Adam of Perseigne ( 1145 – 1221) was a French Cistercian, abbot of Perseigne Abbey in the Diocese of Le Mans.

Adam was born around 1145 into a serf, or peasant, family. He is thought to have been first a canon regular, later a Benedictine of Marmoutier Abbey, Tours, and then a Cistercian. In 1188, he became abbot of Perseigne Abbey, to which his reputation for holiness and wisdom drew the great personages of his time to seek his advice. He was for a time the confessor to King Richard Lionheart of England. He had at Rome a conference with the celebrated mystic, Joachim, Abbot of Flora, (in Calabria, Italy), on the subject of the latter's revelations, and aided Foulques de Neuilly in preaching during the Fourth Crusade. He died in 1221.

His sermons were published at Rome in 1662, under the title Adami Abbatis Perseniæ Ordinis Cisterciensis Mariale. About half his known letters remained in circulation after the invention of the printing press in various collected formats. These collections were subsequently incorporated into the Patrologia Latina in volume CCXI.

Many of his letters were addressed to members of the House of Champagne (e.g. the countesses of Chartres and of Châlons) and to the bishops and leading ecclesiastics of the dioceses of Le Mans, Chartres and of Normandy (especially Rouen). A virgin, Agnes, is addressed several times in the final volume. Adam's letters have strong moral as well as spiritual content (examples among many, those to the Rouen ecclesiastics).

References
 Alfred Andrea (1985), "Adam of Perseigne and the Fourth Crusade", Cîteaux. Commentarii Cistercienses Achel 36(1–2): 21–37.
 Aurélie Reinbold (2013), "Les cercles de l'amitié dans la correspondance d'Adam de Perseigne (1188-1221)", Les cisterciens dans le Maine et dans l'Ouest au Moyen Âge, Ghislain Baury, Vincent Corriol, Emmanuel Johans and Laurent Maillet (ed.), Annales de Bretagne et des Pays de l'Ouest, t. 120, n° 3, September 2013, pp. 87–98.
 Laurent Maillet (2013), "Les missions d'Adam de Perseigne, émissaire de Rome et de Cîteaux (1190-1221)", Les cisterciens dans le Maine et dans l'Ouest au Moyen Âge, Ghislain Baury, Vincent Corriol, Emmanuel Johans and Laurent Maillet (ed.), Annales de Bretagne et des Pays de l'Ouest, t. 120, n° 3, September 2013, pp. 99–116.
 Bryan Trussler: 'The Book of Mutual Love' of Adam of Perseigne: A translation with a revised critical edition and commentaries (France). Thesis Wilfrid Laurier University 1992 (online).
Placide Deseille: Lettres d'Adam de Perseigne, 3 volumes Sources Chrétiennes nos. 66  571 572, Cerf,1960,2015,2015

Notes

Attribution

1140s births
1221 deaths
French Cistercians
French abbots
French Benedictines
Year of birth uncertain